The Spain women's national handball team is the national team of Spain. It is governed by the Royal Spanish Handball Federation and takes part in international handball competitions.

Spain was the big surprise of the 2008 European Championship, making it to the final after beating Romania and Germany and getting a draw against Norway, all of which were expected to beat Spain. In the final, Spain once again met Norway. They couldn't repeat their efforts from the group stage, however, and lost 34–21.

Results

Mediterranean Games

 1979 –  Runners-up
 1987 –  3rd place
 1991 –  3rd place
 1993 –  3rd place
 1997 – 5th place
 2001 –  Runners-up
 2005 –  Champions
 2009 – 4th place
 2013 – 5th place
 2018 –  Champions
 2022 –  Champions

Performance in other tournaments 
 Carpathian Trophy 2001 – Second place
 Carpathian Trophy 2007 – Second place
 Carpathian Trophy 2013 – Third place

Team

Current squad
Squad for the 2022 European Women's Handball Championship.

Head coach: José Ignacio Prades

Coaching history

Notable players
Players who have seen their individual performance recognized at international tournaments, either as Most Valuable Player or as a member of the All-Star Team.
All-Star Team
Carmen Martín, 2008 Junior World Championship, 2011 World Championship, 2014 European Championship, 2016 European Championship, 2018 European Championship
Begoña Fernández, 2008 European Championship, 2009 World Championship
Marta Mangué, 2009 World Championship, 2012 Summer Olympics
Nerea Pena, 2010 European Championship
Alexandrina Cabral, 2019 World Championship

Individual all-time records

Most matches played
Total number of matches played for the senior national team.

Last updated: 4 November 2021

Most goals scored
Total number of goals scored in official matches only.

Last updated: 4 November 2021

References

External links

IHF profile

National team
Handball
Women's national handball teams